Abreulândia is a municipality located in the Brazilian state of Tocantins.

The municipality contains 9.44% of the  Ilha do Bananal / Cantão Environmental Protection Area, created in 1997.

References

Municipalities in Tocantins